Verrucaria madida is a species of saxicolous (rock-dwelling), aquatic, crustose lichen in the family Verrucariaceae. Found in Europe, it was formally described as a new species in 2004 by British lichenologist Alan Orange. There it was growing on shallowly submerged rocks in a lightly shaded woodland stream. The lichen has a thin, smooth, dark green to dark greenish-grey thallus with a somewhat gelatinous consistency. The asci (spore-bearing structures) of Verrucaria madida contain four ascospores; this is highly unusual for genus Verrucaria, which typically has eight-spored asci.

In addition to France, Verrucaria madida was reported by Orange to been found growing on frequently immersed siliceous rocks in streams in South Wales and Norway, although he suggested that it is likely to have been overlooked by collectors and perhaps has a wider European distribution. This was later confirmed when the lichen was reported from the Southern Black Forest in Central Europe, and from Poland. Nearby associates of the Polish specimens were other freshwater lichens: Verrucaria aquatilis, V. hydrela, and Hydropunctaria rheitrophila.

See also
List of Verrucaria species

References

madida
Lichen species
Lichens described in 2004
Lichens of Europe
Taxa named by Alan Orange